Swamp Yankee is a colloquial term for rural Yankees (northeastern Americans). The term "Yankee" connotes urbane industriousness, whereas the term "Swamp Yankee" suggests a more countrified, stubborn, independent, and less-refined sub-type.

Usage
Ruth Schell claims that the phrase is used predominantly in Rhode Island by immigrant minority groups to describe a rural person "of stubborn, old-fashioned, frugal, English-speaking Yankee stock, of good standing in the rural community, but usually possessing minimal formal education and little desire to augment it." 

Swamp Yankees themselves react to the term with slight disapproval or indifference.… The term is unfavorably received when used by a city dweller with the intention of ridiculing a country resident; however, when one country resident refers to another as a swamp Yankee, no offense is taken, and it is treated as good-natured jest.

At one time, swamp Yankees had their own variety of isolated country music, according to Harvard professor Paul Di Maggio and Vanderbilt University professor Richard Peterson. Kerry W. Buckley describes President Calvin Coolidge as a swamp Yankee in a 2003 article in The New England Quarterly, defining the term as the "scion of an old family that was no longer elite or monied". Schell predicts that "the term swamp Yankee is becoming less known and may be unknown in a few generations…. Probably the best reason for its disappearance is the vanishing of the swamp Yankee himself as society moves toward urban and suburban life."

History

The origin of the term "Swamp Yankee" is unclear. Several theories speculate that "Swamp Yankees" were the undesirable, trouble-making New Englanders who moved to the swamps of southeastern New England upon arriving in the New World in the 17th century. Others speculate that the original "Swamp Yankees" were colonial-era indentured servants who were paid for their service with swamp land from the farmers to whom they were indentured. Still others claim that "Swamp Yankees" had ancestors who fought in the Great Swamp Fight of King Philip's War. Another theory claims that the term originated during the American Revolution when residents of Thompson, Connecticut fled to the surrounding swamps to escape a feared British invasion in 1776. They returned from the swamps several weeks later and were ridiculed as "Swamp Yankees".

There are several early references to the term which have survived in various periodicals. A 1901 article published in the Mahoney City American and Waterbury Democrat refers to an undertaker and a wealthy coal dealer from Waterbury, Connecticut as "swamp yankees". A 1912 Metropolitan Magazine article describes the son of a New England mill owner as a "Swamp Yankee". In 1921, Modern Connecticut Homes and Homecrafts describes a "swamp yankee" living in an old unpainted home in New England but caring about his beds of flowers. A bowling team in a 1922 Norwich, Connecticut newspaper called themselves the "Swamp Yankees". In 1935, the New York Times labeled "Swamp Yankees" as those driven out of a New England mill town by immigrants.

See also
Bonackers
Country
Cracker (pejorative)
Flag of New England
Johnny Reb
Piney (Pine Barrens resident)
Raggies
Redneck
Yankee
Yankee ingenuity

Notes

References
Ruth Schell, "Swamp Yankee", American Speech, 1963, Volume 38, No.2 (The American Dialect Society, Published by Duke University Press ), pg. 121–123. accessed through JSTOR
Alan Rosenberg "Is Swamp Yankee an insult or a badge of honor", Providence Journal Charlestown, February 29, 2008
Excerpt from Legendary Connecticut by David Philips
Hans Kurath, Linguistic Atlas of New England, II (Providence, R.I.), map 450.
Captain Harry Allen Chippendale, Sails and Whales (Boston, 1951), pp 105–6.
Philip Jerome Cleveland, It's Bright in My Valley (Westwood, N.J., 1962), p. 30.
"Sayings of the Oracle", Yankee (August, 1962), p. 12.
Joseph Bensman; Arthur J. Vidich, "The New Middle Classes: Their Culture and Life Styles", Journal of Aesthetic Education, Vol.4, No. 1, (Jan., 1970), pp. 23–39.
Richard A. Peterson; Paul Di Maggio, "From Region to Class, the Changing Locus of Country Music: A Test of the Massification Hypothesis", Social Forces (University of North Carolina Press, 1975), 499.

American culture
American regional nicknames
Connecticut culture
English-American culture in Connecticut
English-American culture in Massachusetts
English-American culture in Rhode Island
English-American history
Ethnic and religious slurs
History of Rhode Island
Massachusetts culture
New England
Rhode Island culture
Rural culture in the United States
Social class in the United States
Stereotypes of rural people
Stereotypes of white Americans
Stereotypes of the working class
Working-class culture in the United States
English phrases